Two-time defending champions Peter Fleming and John McEnroe successfully defended their title, defeating Peter McNamara and Paul McNamee in the final, 6–4, 6–3 to win the doubles tennis title at the 1980 Masters Grand Prix.

Knockout stage

Draw

References
1980 Masters-Doubles

Doubles